Luca Selmi from the University of Udine, Italy was named Fellow of the Institute of Electrical and Electronics Engineers (IEEE) in 2015 for research on carrier transport and reliability of semiconductor devices.

References

Fellow Members of the IEEE
Living people
Year of birth missing (living people)
Place of birth missing (living people)
Academic staff of the University of Udine